Quasiperiodicity is the property of a system that displays irregular periodicity. Periodic behavior is defined as recurring at regular intervals, such as "every 24 hours". Quasiperiodic behavior is a pattern of recurrence with a component of unpredictability that does not lend itself to precise measurement. It is different from the mathematical concept of an almost periodic function, which has increasing regularity over multiple periods.

Climatology
Climate oscillations that appear to follow a regular pattern but which do not have a fixed period are called quasiperiodic.

Within a dynamical system such as the ocean-atmosphere oscillations may occur regularly, when they are forced by a regular external forcing: for example, the familiar winter-summer cycle is forced by variations in sunlight from the (very close to perfectly) periodic motion of the earth around the sun. Or, like the recent ice age cycles, they may be less regular but still locked by external forcing. However, when the system contains the potential for an oscillation, but there is no strong external forcing it to be phase-locked to it, the "period" is likely to be irregular.

The canonical example of quasiperiodicity in climatology is El Niño–Southern Oscillation (ENSO). ENSO is highly consequential for wheat cultivation in Australia. Models to predict and thereby assist adaptation to ENSO have a large potential benefit to Australian wheat farmers. In the modern era, it has a "period" somewhere between four and twelve years and a peak spectral density around five years.

See also
Nonlinear resonance
Quasiperiodic function
Quasiperiodic motion
Quasi-periodic oscillations
Quasiperiodic tiling
Seasonality

References

Systems theory
Dynamical systems
Wave mechanics